Pullela Gayatri Gopichand (born 4 March 2003) is an Indian badminton player. She is the daughter of former badminton players P. V. V. Lakshmi and Pullela Gopichand. She was part of the national team that clinched the women's team gold medal at the 2019 South Asian Games, and a silver in the women's singles; She also competed at the 2022 Commonwealth Games, winning a silver in the mixed team and a bronze medal in the women's doubles. Gopichand became the first woman Indian doubles specialist to make the semi-finals of All England Open 21 years after her father's feat.

Achievements

Commonwealth Games 

Women's doubles

South Asian Games 
Women's singles

BWF World Tour (1 title, 1 runner-up) 
The BWF World Tour, which was announced on 19 March 2017 and implemented in 2018, is a series of elite badminton tournaments sanctioned by the Badminton World Federation (BWF). The BWF World Tour is divided into levels of World Tour Finals, Super 1000, Super 750, Super 500, Super 300 (part of the HSBC World Tour), and the BWF Tour Super 100.

Women's doubles

BWF International Challenge/Series (1 title, 5 runners-up) 
Women's singles

Women's doubles

Mixed doubles

  BWF International Challenge tournament
  BWF International Series tournament
  BWF Future Series tournament

References

External links 
 

2003 births
Living people
Indian female badminton players
Badminton players at the 2018 Asian Games
Asian Games competitors for India
Badminton players at the 2022 Commonwealth Games
Commonwealth Games silver medallists for India
Commonwealth Games bronze medallists for India
Commonwealth Games medallists in badminton
South Asian Games gold medalists for India
South Asian Games silver medalists for India
South Asian Games medalists in badminton
Medallists at the 2022 Commonwealth Games
Indian national badminton champions